Theodore Gorman Lewis (November 19, 1890December 5, 1934) was an American lawyer and politician from Wisconsin.  He was a justice of the Wisconsin Supreme Court for the last 20 days of his life.

Biography

Born in McFarland, Wisconsin, Lewis graduated from the University of Wisconsin and received his law degree from the University of Wisconsin Law School in 1915. He served in the United States Army during World War I, was wounded at Château-Thierry, and was awarded the Purple Heart. Lewis was district attorney of Dane County, Wisconsin from 1921 to 1925. He also served as city attorney of Madison, Wisconsin from 1930 to 1933. Lewis was also executive secretary to the governor of Wisconsin. On November 15, 1934, Lewis was appointed to the Wisconsin Supreme Court only to die of pneumonia twenty days later on December 5, 1934, before he could hear a case.

References

External links

People from McFarland, Wisconsin
University of Wisconsin–Madison alumni
University of Wisconsin Law School alumni
Justices of the Wisconsin Supreme Court
1890 births
1934 deaths
Deaths from pneumonia in Wisconsin
20th-century American judges